Hristijan is a Macedonian male given name, which is a form of the name Christian, meaning a "follower of Christ". The name may refer to:

Hristijan Dragarski (born 1992), Macedonian football player
Hristijan Kirovski (born 1985), Macedonian football player
Hristijan Todorovski Karpoš (1921–1944), Macedonian political activist

References

Macedonian masculine given names